The Melbourne Journal of International Law ('MJIL') is a biannual peer-reviewed law review associated with Melbourne Law School which covers all areas of public and private international law. It was established in 2000 and is one of two student-run law journals at the University of Melbourne (the other being the Melbourne University Law Review). MJIL is edited and managed by an editorial board of around 70 law students of Melbourne Law School, overseen by three Editors, Faculty Advisors, and an Advisory Board.

The 2023 Editors are Eleanor Twomey, Jonathan Ta and Jasmine Gan.

Together with the Melbourne University Law Review, the Journal produces the Australian Guide to Legal Citation.

History

Establishment 
MJIL was established in 2000 by its founding Editors: Suzan Davies, Peter Henley, Kalika Jayasekera, Amanda Rologas and Tracy Whiriskey; and the Law Faculty of the University of Melbourne. The Journal was established in recognition of the shortage of academic and practice-oriented material dealing with the Asia-Pacific region's relationship with both private and public international law.

Objectives 
MJIL is a generalist international law academic journal. Its content encompasses both private and public international law.  The Journal was established as a forum for academics to publish modern perspectives on international law. MJIL aims to facilitate informed and considered discussion of contemporary international issues. It is invested in publishing a wide range of styles, perspectives and opinions through articles, book reviews, case notes, commentaries, review essays and think pieces.

MJIL Publications 
MJIL publishes two issues per year in July and December. However, volume one was published as a single issue. Each issue is available in hard copy format and online on various legal journal databases.

Advance Access Policy 
In 2016, MJIL introduced an advanced access policy. Articles that have passed the entire editing process well before final publication in their corresponding issue are uploaded on the MJIL website as an advance copy. This ensures that the author’s work is disseminated as early as possible. Advanced versions are subject to change prior to the final print and online publication of the article.

Past Symposiums, Special Features and Special Focus Issues 
The Journal produces symposium issues devoted to particular aspects of international law. Past symposium and special focus issues include:

MJIL also publishes ‘features’ if one or several articles provide an in-depth focus on a topical issue of international law, or otherwise to highlight pieces of a unique contribution to international law academia.

Australian Guide to Legal Citation
In collaboration with the Melbourne University Law Review, the Journal publishes the Australian Guide to Legal Citation ('AGLC'). The Australian Guide to Legal Citation is the most widely used legal citation style-guide in the Australian legal community. The AGLC is in its 4th edition and was published in November 2018.

MJIL Prize
The ‘Melbourne Journal of International Law Prize for Outstanding Scholarship in International Law’ (‘MJIL Prize’) is awarded annually to an author whose article or commentary was published in MJIL in the previous calendar year. Its goal is to promote and reward significant scholarly contributions to international law. Adjudged winners of the MJIL Prize are considered to have demonstrated the most thought-provoking engagement with relevant areas, events and issues in international law for that volume. The prize was introduced by the 2019 Editors and was first awarded to joint winners for their articles published in volume 19.

The prize is judged by a panel of three eminent international law scholars appointed by the Editors of MJIL. At least one member of the Panel must be a member of MJIL’s Advisory Board.

Sir Kenneth Bailey Memorial Lecture 
MJIL has co-hosted the Sir Kenneth Bailey Memorial Lecture with the Melbourne Law School since 2016. The Sir Kenneth Bailey Memorial Lecture was inaugurated in 1999, at the Commemoration of the Centenary of the 1899 Hague Peace Conference held at the University of Melbourne. The lecture, which focuses on the international legal order, honors the Fourth Dean of the Melbourne Law School, Kenneth Hamilton Bailey, who played a significant part in Australia's contribution to the formation of the United Nations.

Past lectures have been recorded and uploaded on the MJIL website. The lectures are occasionally published in the following MJIL issue if the speaker approves.

Editors-in-chief
The following persons have been editors-in-chief:

References

External links 
 

International law journals
University of Melbourne
Australian law journals
Biannual journals
Open access journals
English-language journals
Publications established in 2000